140 is a platform game independently developed by Jeppe Carlsen, known for his gameplay direction for Playdead's Limbo.  The game is described as a "minimalistic platformer", using electronic music to create synesthesia as the player makes their way through four different levels, each with its own sound-track. The game-play has been compared to other similar games which involve music synchronization like Sound Shapes and the Bit.Trip series, though with difficult platforming elements comparable to games in the Mega Man series. The game was released on Microsoft Windows, OS X, and Linux systems in October 2013, on Xbox One in August 2016, on PlayStation 4, Wii U in September 2016, and Nintendo Switch in January 2020. A release on PlayStation Vita and Nintendo 3DS was planned, but later cancelled.

Gameplay

As described by Carlsen, 140 is "an old school platformer", but where the challenge is "in syncing up your moves and jumps to the music-controlled elements"; as the player progresses through a level, the music will change to reflect the difficulty of the platforming elements. The player controls a geometric shape—a square when stationary, a circle when moving, and a triangle when jumping—across a two-dimensional environment made up of other simple geometric shapes, with the objective being to reach the end of the course. Along the way the player will need to collect floating colored balls that, when placed in a semicircular fixture on the ground, activate a new type of platforming obstacle that allows the player to continue. These activations have the effects of changing the color palette of the level and adding a new element to the music to which the new obstacle is synchronized.

Various obstacles and enemies, represented by geometric shapes, test the player's skills, and should the shape fall or be hit by one of the shapes filled with white noise, they will need to restart at the last checkpoint they passed. All of these obstacles and enemies have actions that are synchronized to the music, aiding the player in moving through the course; platforms that move or appear and disappear will do so on the beat, while enemies will fire in time to the music.

Development

140 was a project developed by Carlsen in his off-hours from Playdead. The idea originally grew out of Carlsen's attempt at an old school platformer, akin to Mega Man, that involved throwing a ball that would travel in straight lines and bounce off walls to trigger effects. Carlsen used the project to learn about the Unity game engine. As he started to add audio samples to the game, he found an interesting juxtaposition between the normal platform elements and the music, where the level would "dance to the music", and refocused the game towards its final form. Carlsen had worked on the title for about two years, and enlisted the help of Jakob Schmid, a college friend and fellow employee at Playdead, who created all music and sound for the game, and Niels Fyrst and Andreas Peiterson for art.

Carlsen announced in April 2016 that Abstraction Games and Double Fine Productions were helping to port the game to the PlayStation 4, PlayStation Vita, Xbox One, Wii U, and Nintendo 3DS with a release planned in Q4 2016. The Xbox One version was released on August 30, 2016.

Reception

The game won the "Excellence in Audio" category for the 2013 Independent Games Festival awards, and was an honorary mention in the "Technical Excellence" category.

Edge considered the game to initially appear in stark contrast to Carlsen's earlier Limbo, but as the player progresses in the game, the various mechanics of 140 show similar traits to many of the puzzles and situations that Carlsen had developed for Limbo. Ryan Cartmel of  Hardcore Gamer gave the game a 4/5, calling it "gaming minimalism done right." Derrick Sanskrit of The A.V. Club's Gameological Society called 140 "a tightly paced and clever game of precise timing and jumping" and praised its minimalist structure that allows the player to focus on the rhythm and gameplay.

References

External links

Audio design, Jakob Schmid
Visual concept, Niels Fyrst

2013 video games
Cancelled Nintendo 3DS games
Cancelled PlayStation Vita games
Indie video games
Linux games
MacOS games
Nintendo Switch games
Platform games
PlayStation 4 games
Single-player video games
Video games developed in Denmark
Wii U eShop games
Windows games
Xbox One games
Double Fine games